The Lake Providence Commercial Historic District is a  historic district in Lake Providence, Louisiana which was listed on the National Register of Historic Places on December 6, 1979.

The chosen district name was initially Lake Providence Historic District. The district was added "Commercial" after being included in the Lake Providence MRA on October 3, 1980, in order to distinguish it from the newly created Lake Providence Residential Historic District.

The district included 33 contributing buildings which, except for three gaps, enclosed Lake Street. They were late 19th and early 20th century brick commercial buildings, mostly just one story in height.

The district included the "old" courthouse and the "new" courthouse in Lake Providence, both on Courthouse Square.

Most of the building seem to have disappeared after the listing. Of the original 33 contributing properties, only 11 are still standing, with several being in very bad condition.

See also
National Register of Historic Places listings in East Carroll Parish, Louisiana

Lake Providence Residential Historic District
Arlington Plantation
Fischer House
Nelson House
Old Courthouse Square

References

Notes

Historic districts on the National Register of Historic Places in Louisiana
Early Commercial architecture in the United States
Buildings and structures completed in 1900
East Carroll Parish, Louisiana